Penang is a Malaysian state located on the northwest coast of Peninsular Malaysia, by the Malacca Strait. It has two parts: Penang Island, where the capital city, George Town, is located, and Seberang Perai on the Malay Peninsula. They are connected by Malaysia's two longest road bridges, the Penang Bridge and the Sultan Abdul Halim Muadzam Shah Bridge; the latter is also the second longest oversea bridge in Southeast Asia. The second smallest Malaysian state by land mass, Penang, is bordered by Kedah to the north and the east, and Perak to the south.

Penang is the 8th most populated state in Malaysia. It has among the nation's highest population densities and is one of the country's most urbanised states. Seberang Perai is Malaysia's second-largest city by population. Its heterogeneous population is highly diverse in ethnicity, culture, language and religion. Aside from the three main races, the Malays, Chinese, and Indians, Penang is home to significant Eurasian, Siamese and expatriate communities. A resident of Penang is colloquially known as a Penangite or Penang Lang (Penang Hokkien: 庇能儂; Tâi-lô: Pī-néeng-lâng) in Penang Hokkien due to the significant Penangite Chinese population.

Penang's modern history began in 1786, upon the establishment of George Town by Francis Light. Penang formed part of the Straits Settlements in 1826, which became a British crown colony in 1867. Direct British rule was only briefly interrupted during World War II, when Japan occupied Penang; the British retook Penang in 1945. Penang was later merged with the Federation of Malaya (now Malaysia), which gained independence from the British in 1957. 

Following the decline of its entrepôt trade towards the 1970s, Penang's economy was reoriented by the central government towards manufacturing. Today, it has become one of Malaysia's most vital economic powerhouses. Penang has the third highest Human Development Index (HDI) among Malaysia's states and territories, after Kuala Lumpur and Selangor.

Etymology 
The name Penang comes from the modern Malay name Pulau Pinang which means "areca nut island". The State of Penang is also referred to as the Pearl of the Orient and "The Island of Pearls" (in Malay: Pulau Mutiara).

Penang Island was originally known by native seafarers as Pulau Ka-Satu, meaning The First Island, because it was the largest island encountered on the trading sea-route between Lingga and Kedah. Similarly, the Siamese, then the overlord of Kedah, referred to the island as Koh Maak.

History

Prehistory 
Human remains, dating back to about 5,000 to 6,000 years ago, have been uncovered in Seberang Perai, along with seashells, pottery and hunting tools. These artifacts indicate that the earliest inhabitants of Penang were nomadic Melanesians during the Neolithic era.

Early history 
The Cherok Tok Kun megalith in Bukit Mertajam, uncovered in 1845, contains Pali inscriptions, indicating that the Hindu-Buddhist Bujang Valley civilisation based in what is now Kedah had established control over parts of Seberang Perai by the 6th century. The entirety of what is now Penang would later become part of the Sultanate of Kedah up to the late 18th century.

Founding of Penang 

The first British vessel arrived in Penang in June 1592. This ship, the Edward Bonadventure, was captained by James Lancaster. However, it was not until the 18th century did the British establish a permanent presence on the island. Prior to the first British settlement, in the early 18th century, three brothers of cross-strait traders from Minangkabau of Sumatra establish settlements on the island. They were Nakhoda Bayan, Nakhoda Intan, and Nakhoda Kecil who brought several followers from Batubara, northeast of Sumatra. They received the appropriate permissions by Ahmad Tajuddin, the sultan of Kedah, and then establish the settlements in Bayan Lepas, Balik Pulau, Gelugor, and Tanjung (now George Town). Other Minang merchants, Datuk Jannaton and Datuk Maharaja Setia who came in 1749, establish Batu Uban area. 

In the 1770s, Francis Light was instructed by the British East India Company to form trade relations in the Malay Peninsula. Light subsequently landed in Kedah, which was by then a Siamese vassal state. Aware that the Sultanate was under external and internal threats, he promised British military protection to the then Sultan of Kedah, Sultan Muhammad Jiwa Zainal Adilin II; in return, the Sultan offered Penang Island to the British.

It was only in 1786 when the British East India Company finally ordered Light to obtain the island from Kedah. Light negotiated with the new Sultan of Kedah, Sultan Abdullah Mukarram Shah, regarding the cession of the island to the British East India Company in exchange for British military aid. After an agreement between Light and the Sultan was ratified, Light and his entourage sailed on to Penang Island, where they arrived on 17 July 1786. Light took formal possession of the island on 11 August "in the name of His Britannic Majesty, King George III and the Honourable East India Company". Penang Island was renamed the Prince of Wales Island after the heir to the British throne, while the new settlement of George Town was established in honour of King George III.

Unbeknownst to Sultan Abdullah, Light had been acting without the authority or the consent of his superiors in India. When Light reneged on his promise of military protection, the Kedah Sultan launched an attempt to recapture the Prince of Wales Island in 1791; the British East India Company subsequently defeated the Kedah forces. The Sultan sued for peace and an annual payment of 6000 Spanish dollars to the Sultan was agreed.

In 1800, Lieutenant-Governor Sir George Leith secured a strip of hinterland across the Penang Strait which in subsequent years was named Province Wellesley (now Seberang Perai). The treaty, negotiated between Leith's First Assistant George Caunter and the new Sultan of Kedah, superseded Light's earlier agreement and gave the British permanent sovereignty over both Prince of Wales Island and the newly ceded mainland territory. Province Wellesley was then gradually expanded up to its present-day boundaries in 1874. In exchange for the acquisition, the annual payment to the Sultan of Kedah was increased to 10,000 Spanish dollars per annum. From 1874 until 2018, the Malaysian federal government (and its historical predecessors) paid Kedah, on behalf of Penang, RM 10,000 annually as a symbolic gesture.

Since 2018, the Malaysian federal government revised the payments to Kedah, increasing to RM 10 million a year to Kedah (whilst in 2021, the Menteri Besar of Kedah, Muhammad Sanusi Md Nor, in reference to the annual payments, demanded the payments be raised to RM 100 million annually. Despite claims by Sanusi, there was never a lease agreement between Kedah and Penang.)

Colonial Penang

Light founded George Town as a free port to entice traders away from nearby Dutch trading posts. Simultaneously, spices were harvested on the island, turning it into a regional centre for spice production. Consequently, maritime trade at the Port of Penang grew exponentially; the number of incoming vessels rose from 85 in 1786 to 3,569 in 1802.

In 1805, Penang became a separate presidency of British India, sharing similar status with Bombay and Madras. By 1808, a local government for George Town was in place, whilst the establishment of the Supreme Court of Penang marked the birth of Malaysia's modern judiciary. In 1826, Penang, Singapore and Malacca were incorporated into the Straits Settlements, with George Town as the capital.

However, Penang's importance was soon supplanted by Singapore, as the latter rapidly outstripped the Port of Penang as the region's premier entrepôt. In 1832, Singapore replaced George Town as the capital of the Straits Settlements.Even so, the Port of Penang retained its importance as a vital British entrepôt. Towards the end of the 19th century, it became a major tin-exporting harbour. George Town concurrently evolved into Malaya's principal financial hub, as banks and mercantile firms flocked into the city. Meanwhile, other towns, including Bayan Lepas on the island, and Butterworth and Bukit Mertajam in Province Wellesley, emerged due to agricultural and logistical developments.

Throughout the century, Penang's cosmopolitan population, comprising Chinese, Malay, Indian, Peranakan, Eurasian, Thai and other ethnicities, grew rapidly in tandem with the economic prosperity. However, the population growth also led to social problems, such as inadequate sanitation and public health facilities, as well as rampant crime, with the latter culminating in the Penang Riots of 1867. Also in 1867, the Straits Settlements was made a British crown colony. Direct British rule meant better law enforcement, as the police force was beefed up and the secret societies that had previously plagued Penang were gradually outlawed. More investments were also made on health care and public transportation.

Due to the improved access to education, the active participation in municipal affairs by its Asian residents and substantial press freedom, George Town was perceived as being more intellectually receptive than Singapore. The city became a magnet for reputable English authors, Asian intellectuals and revolutionaries, including Rudyard Kipling, Somerset Maugham and Sun Yat-sen.

World wars 
During World War I, in the Battle of Penang, the German cruiser SMS Emden surreptitiously sailed to Penang Island and sank two Allied warships off its coast, Russian protected cruiser Zhemchug and the French destroyer Mousquet. One hundred and forty-seven French and Russian sailors perished during the battle.

World War II, on the other hand, led to unparallelled social and political upheaval. Although Penang Island had been designated as a fortress, Penang fell to the Imperial Japanese Army on 19 December 1941, after suffering devastating aerial attacks. The British covertly evacuated Penang's European populace; historians have since contended that the moral collapse of British rule in Southeast Asia came not at Singapore, but at Penang.Penang Island was subsequently renamed Tojo-to, after Japanese Prime Minister Hideki Tojo. The period of Japanese occupation was renowned for the Imperial Japanese Army's massacres of Penang's Chinese populace, known as Sook Ching to the locals. Women in Penang were also coerced to work as comfort women by the Japanese. Meanwhile, the Port of Penang was put to use as a major submarine base by the Axis Powers.

In the last years of the war, Allied bombers from India repeatedly bombed George Town, seeking to destroy the naval facilities and administrative centres. Several colonial buildings were destroyed or damaged, such as the Government Offices, St. Xavier's Institution and Hutchings School (now Penang State Museum). The Penang Strait was also mined to constrict Japanese shipping. Following the surrender of Japan, British forces launched Operation Jurist to recapture Penang Island on 3 September 1945, making George Town the first city in Malaya to be liberated from the Japanese.

Post-war years

Penang was placed under a military administration until 1946. Subsequently, the Straits Settlements was abolished, as the British sought to consolidate the various political entities in British Malaya under a single polity named the Malayan Union. The now separate Crown Colony of Penang was consequently merged into the Malayan Union, which was then replaced by the Federation of Malaya in 1948.

The idea of the absorption of Penang into the vast Malay heartland initially proved unpopular amongst Penangites. Economic and ethnic concerns led to the formation of the Penang Secessionist Committee in 1948. However, the committee's attempt to avert Penang's merger with Malaya ultimately petered out due to British disapproval.

The British government allayed the concerns raised by the secessionists by guaranteeing George Town's free port status, as well as reintroducing municipal elections in George Town in 1951. By 1956, George Town became the first fully elected municipality in Malaya and in the following year, it was granted city status by Queen Elizabeth II, becoming the first city within the Federation of Malaya, and by extension, Malaysia.

Post-independence era 
 George Town was, since colonial times, a free port—until its sudden revocation by the Malaysian federal government in 1969. Penang subsequently suffered an economic crisis, with the loss of maritime trade resulting in massive unemployment and brain drain. To alleviate the downturn, the then Chief Minister, Lim Chong Eu, masterminded the construction of the Bayan Lepas Free Industrial Zone. The zone, regarded by many as the Silicon Valley of the East, proved instrumental in reversing Penang's economic slump and led to the state's rapid economic growth until the late 1990s.

During Lim's tenure, a number of major infrastructural projects were also undertaken, chiefly the Penang Bridge, the first road link between Penang Island and the Malay Peninsula. Completed in 1985, it was the longest bridge in Southeast Asia until 2014 when it was superseded by the Second Penang Bridge.However, the persistent brain drain, exacerbated by federal government policies that favoured the development of Kuala Lumpur, meant that Penang was no longer at the forefront of the country's economy by the 2000s. Penang's economy slowed down in the early 2000s, while the deteriorating state of affairs in general, including an incoherent urban planning policy, poor traffic management and the dilapidation of George Town's heritage buildings due to the repeal of the Rent Control Act in 2001, led to simmering discontent within Penang's society.

In response, George Town's non-governmental organisations (NGOs) and the national press galvanised public support and formed strategic partnerships to restore the city to its former glory. Also as a result of the widespread resentment, the then federal opposition coalition, Pakatan Rakyat (now Pakatan Harapan), was voted into power within Penang in the 2008 State Election, replacing the erstwhile administration led by the Barisan Nasional. Meanwhile, the efforts to conserve George Town's heritage architecture paid off, when in 2008, the city's historical core was inscribed as a UNESCO World Heritage Site. The city of George Town along with Malacca City was confirmed as a a UNESCO World Heritage Site in 2011. 

The Indian Ocean tsunami which struck on Boxing Day of 2004 hit the western and northern coasts of Penang Island, claiming 52 lives (out of 68 in Malaysia).

Geography

With a total land area of just , Penang is the second smallest state in Malaysia by area after Perlis. Penang, situated at the northwestern coastline of Peninsular Malaysia, lies between latitudes 5.59° and 5.12°N, and longitudes 100.17° and 100.56°E. The state consists of Penang Island, Seberang Perai (a narrow strip of the Malay Peninsula) and a handful of smaller islets. Its capital city, George Town, is located at the northeastern tip of Penang Island.

Topography
Penang is geographically divided into two major halves physically divided by the Penang Strait.
 Penang Island, a  island.
 Seberang Perai, a  hinterland on the Malay Peninsula. It is bordered by Kedah to the east and north, and by Perak to the south.
The Penang Strait is further divided into the North Channel and the South Channel. At the strait's narrowest section, George Town on the island is separated from Butterworth on the mainland by a mere .Penang Island is irregularly shaped, with a hilly and mostly forested interior; its coastal plains are narrow, the most extensive of which is at the northeastern cape. From a small settlement at the northeastern tip of Penang Island, George Town has expanded over the centuries, particularly in the northwestern, western and southern directions, eventually linking up with Bayan Lepas at the island's southeast and urbanising the entire eastern coast of the island. Meanwhile, the topography of Seberang Perai is mostly flat, save for a few hills such as Bukit Mertajam.

The major rivers within Penang include the Pinang, Perai, Muda and Kerian rivers. In particular, the Muda River serves as the northern border between Seberang Perai and Kedah, while the Kerian River forms the southern boundary between Seberang Perai, Kedah and Perak.

Due to land scarcity, land reclamation projects have been undertaken in high-demand areas such as Tanjung Tokong, Jelutong and Gurney Drive. The latter is being transformed into Gurney Wharf which is a planned seafront park, with land for this purpose currently being reclaimed off Gurney Drive in George Town. Intended as a "new iconic waterfront destination for Penang", Phase 1 of the development is scheduled for completion by 2018. Upon the expected completion of Gurney Wharf by August 2021, the 24.28-hectare seafront park will comprise four distinct recreational areas - a beach, a coastal grove, a water garden, and a seaside retail food and beverages (F&B) area. An additional reclamation project at Bayan Baru themed “Linear Waterfront" would extend the electronics-dominated Free Industrial Zone and would include improving and adding fishermen's wharves set up as well also have hotels, restaurants, medical and other developments.

Nature and parks 

In spite of rapid urbanisation, Penang has still managed to safeguard a considerable area of natural environment. Within the state,  have been designated as protected forest reserves.

The central hills of Penang Island, including Penang Hill, serve as the green lung for the urbanised island. Two of the major parks within George Town - the Penang Botanical Gardens and the City Park - are situated near the hills.

Penang is also home to the smallest national park in the world - the Penang National Park. Covering  of the northwestern tip of Penang Island, it encompasses mangrove swamps, rainforest interspersed with hiking trails and tranquil beaches. Other notable natural attractions nearby include the Tropical Spice Garden and the Entopia Butterfly Farm, the latter of which was Malaysia's first butterfly sanctuary.

In Seberang Perai, the Penang Bird Park, established in 1988 in Seberang Jaya, was the first aviary in Malaysia.

Outlying islets 
Penang also consists of nine other islets off its coasts. The biggest of all, Jerejak Island, is located in the South Channel of the Penang Strait. Once the site of a leper asylum built in 1868, which was later converted into a maximum-security penitentiary, Jerejak Island remains heavily forested. The other islets under the jurisdiction of Penang include Aman, Betong, Gedung, Kendi and Rimau.

Climate

As in the rest of Malaysia, Penang has a tropical rainforest climate bordering on a tropical monsoon climate, although the state does experience slightly drier conditions from December to February of the following year. The climate is very much dictated by the surrounding sea and the prevailing wind system.

Penang's proximity with the island of Sumatra makes it susceptible to dust particles carried by wind from perennial but transient forest fires, creating a phenomenon known as the Southeast Asian haze.

The Penang Meteorological Office in Bayan Lepas is the primary weather forecast facility for northern Malaysia.

Urban and suburban areas

George Town Conurbation 

Penang forms the heart of the Greater Penang Conurbation, Malaysia's second biggest conurbation. Centred in George Town, the metropolitan area encompasses the entire State of Penang, southern Kedah and northern Perak. , Greater Penang had nearly 2.5 million residents, second only to Greater Kuala Lumpur (Klang Valley). Greater Penang also generated a GDP of US$13,596,418 in 2010, making the conurbation the second biggest contributor of Malaysia's GDP after Greater Kuala Lumpur.

Governance and law

Penang, being a former British crown colony, is one of only four Malaysian states without hereditary monarchies. The head of state of Penang is the Governor, who is appointed by the King of Malaysia. The present Governor of Penang, Ahmad Fuzi Abdul Razak, assumed office on 1 May 2021. In practice, the Governor is a figurehead whose functions are chiefly symbolic and ceremonial.

The Penang state government has its own executive council and legislature, but they have relatively limited powers in comparison with those of the Malaysian federal government. According to the Malaysian Federal Constitution, the state may legislate on matters pertaining to Malay customs, land, agriculture and forestry, local government, civil and water works, and state administration, whereas matters that fall under the joint purview of both state and federal authorities include social welfare, wildlife protection and national parks, scholarships, husbandry, town planning, drainage and irrigation, and public health and health regulations.

The Constitution of Penang, codified in 1957, embodies the state's highest laws. Consisting of 42 articles, the constitution pertains to the proceedings and powers of the state government.

Executive

The Penang State Executive Council is the executive authority of the Penang state government, similar in function to the national Cabinet. It is led by the Chief Minister, who serves as the head of government in Penang. To this day, Penang remains the only Malaysian state where the position of the head of government has been continuously held by an ethnic Chinese since the nation's independence in 1957.

The current Chief Minister of Penang is Chow Kon Yeow of the Democratic Action Party (DAP), who assumed office after the 2018 State Election. Following the 2008 State Election, the Pakatan Rakyat coalition (now Pakatan Harapan), which at the time consisted of the DAP, the People's Justice Party (PKR) and the Malaysian Islamic Party (PAS), formed the Penang state government, with the head of government going to the former for being the single largest party in the state legislature.

Legislature

The unicameral 40-seat Penang State Legislative Assembly, whose members are called State Assemblymen, convenes at the neoclassical Penang State Assembly Building in George Town. Penang practises the Westminster system whereby members of the Penang State Executive Council are appointed from amongst the elected State Assemblymen. Moreover, the dissolution of the Penang State Legislative Assembly, typically conducted prior to a State Election, requires the consent of the governor of Penang.

Following the 2018 State Election, the Pakatan Harapan (PH) coalition commands a supermajority in the legislature by controlling 37 seats. Out of the 37 PH seats, 19 are retained by the Democratic Action Party (DAP), 14 by the People's Justice Party (PKR), two by the Malaysian United Indigenous Party (Bersatu) and two by the National Trust Party (Amanah). The state opposition is formed by the Barisan Nasional (BN) coalition, which holds two seats, and the Malaysian Islamic Party (PAS), which occupies one seat.

Amendments to Penang's Constitution require the support of two-thirds of the Penang State Legislative Assembly.

Local governments 
There are currently two local governments in Penang.
 The Penang Island City Council administers the entirety of Penang Island, which includes the city of George Town. It is made up of a mayor, a city secretary and 24 councillors.
 The Seberang Perai City Council is in charge of Seberang Perai. It also consists of a mayor, a city secretary and 24 councillors.

Both the mayor of Penang Island and Seberang Perai are appointed by the Penang state government for a two-year term, while the councillors are appointed for one-year terms of office. The local councils are responsible, among others, for regulating traffic and parking, maintaining cleanliness and drainage, managing waste disposal, issuing business licenses, and overseeing public health.

Penang is also divided into five administrative districts - two on Penang Island and three in Seberang Perai. Each district is headed by a district officer. The lands and district office in each district deals with land administration and revenue; thus it differs from the local governments (city council) which oversee the provision and maintenance of urban infrastructure.

Judiciary 

The Malaysian legal system had its roots in 19th-century George Town. In 1807, a Royal Charter was granted to Penang which provided for the establishment of a Supreme Court. The Supreme Court of Penang, then sited at Fort Cornwallis, was opened in 1808. Sir Edmond Stanley assumed office as the First Recorder of the Supreme Court in 1808, thus serving as the first Superior Court Judge in British Malaya. The legal establishment in Penang was progressively extended to the whole of Malaya by 1951.

Today, the Penang High Court in George Town sits at the pinnacle of the hierarchy of courts within Penang. There are also four Magistrates Courts and two Sessions Courts scattered throughout the state.

Foreign relations 
A total of 24 countries have either established their consulates or appointed honorary consuls within Penang. The State of Penang has also ratified a sister state agreement with Japan's Kanagawa Prefecture and a friendship state agreement with China's Hainan Province. In addition, George Town is twinned with eight sister cities and five friendship cities, while Seberang Perai has four sister cities.

Consulates

Sister cities 
  Jakarta, Indonesia
  Bangkok, Thailand
  Kuala Lumpur, Malaysia
  Singapore
  Adelaide, Australia

Demographics

In addition, Penang is one of the most urbanised Malaysian states, with an urbanisation level of 90.8% .

Due to its vibrant economy, Penang is also one of the major recipients of interstate migrants within Malaysia. Between 2015 and 2016, Penang achieved the highest migration effectiveness ratio among Malaysian states; for every 100 Malaysians that migrated into and out of Penang, the state's population increased by 58 persons. The bulk of the interstate immigrants came from Perak, Selangor, Kedah, Johor and Kuala Lumpur.

Penang's population is almost equally distributed between the island and the mainland.

The Greater Penang Conurbation, which also covers parts of neighbouring Kedah and Perak, is the second largest metropolitan area in the nation, with almost 2.5 million inhabitants .

Ethnicities 
Penang has been regarded as a Chinese state because of their high population but in recent years, the proportion of Bumiputeras within the state, which include ethnic Malays and East Malaysian indigenous races, has reached parity with that of the Chinese. 2021 estimates from Malaysia's Department of Statistics showed that the Bumiputeras constituted more than 40% of Penang's population, whereas the Chinese made up another 40%. Ethnic Indians comprised nearly 10% of the state's populace.

In particular, George Town remains a Chinese-majority city, with the Chinese making up over half of the city's population . George Town's Chinese populace includes the Peranakan, a hybrid ethnicity whose rich legacies can still be seen to this day in the form of distinctive architectures, costumes and cuisine. Moreover, the city is also renowned for its more cosmopolitan population, which also comprises indigenous East Malaysians, the Eurasians and the Siamese. Meanwhile, the Malays have formed the plurality in Seberang Perai.

In addition, Penang is home to a sizeable expatriate population, especially from Singapore, Japan and various Asian countries, as well as other Commonwealth nations. Almost 9% of Penang's population consisted of foreigners, reflecting the well-established allure of Penang amongst expatriates. Most expatriates settle within the vicinity of George Town; the city's northern suburbs, such as Tanjung Tokong, Tanjung Bungah and Batu Ferringhi, are particularly popular.

Languages
Major languages spoken in Penang are Malay, English, Hokkien, Mandarin, and Tamil. In particular, Penang is well known for its distinctive Hokkien language, known as Penang Hokkien.

Under British rule, English was the official language in Penang. The mushrooming of English and missionary schools throughout George Town contributed greatly to the widespread use of the language in the state.

As in the rest of Malaysia, Malay is currently the official language in Penang. The Malays in Penang also use a variant of the Kedah Malay dialect, with slight modifications made to the original dialect to suit the conditions of an urban, cosmopolitan society.

Tamil is the most widely spoken language amongst Penang's Indian community. There are also other Indian languages spoken by minority Indians such as Telugu, Malayalam and Punjabi who hailed from diverse ancestries in the Indian subcontinent. Meanwhile, Penang's Chinese population uses a variety of Chinese dialects, including Hakka and Cantonese. Mandarin, more commonly used by youths, has been the medium of instruction in Chinese schools throughout the state.

Penang Hokkien serves as the lingua franca among the various ethnic Chinese communities in Penang. Originally a variant of the Minnan language, Penang Hokkien has absorbed numerous loanwords from Malay and English, yet another legacy of the Peranakan culture. It is spoken by many Penangites irrespective of race for communication purposes. Greater emphasis has been placed on preserving the language's relevance in the face of the increasing influence of Mandarin and English among the youth.

Religions
As with other Peninsular states, Islam is the official religion of the State of Penang. Even so, other religions are allowed to be practised within the state, contributing to its cosmopolitan society.

, Muslims constituted over 44% of Penang's population, followed by Buddhists at nearly 36% and Hindus at almost 9%. Notably, smaller communities of Chinese Muslims and Indian Muslims have long existed within George Town, while most Buddhists in Penang follow either Theravada, Mahayana or Vajrayana traditions. A significant multiracial community of Christians, of both Catholic and Protestant sects, also exist in Penang, consisting of ethnic Chinese, Indians, Eurasians, East Malaysian migrants and expatriates. Meanwhile, more than 10% of the state's Chinese populace adhere to Taoism and other Chinese folk religions.

One particular street in George Town exemplifies the harmonious coexistence of the various religions in Penang. Along Pitt Street, Muslim, Taoist, Hindu and Christian places of worship are situated just metres away from one another, earning the street its nickname, the Street of Harmony. This reflects Penang's diverse ethnic and socio-cultural amalgamation.

There was once a tiny community of Jews in George Town, who mainly resided along Jalan Zainal Abidin (formerly Yahudi Road). The last known native Jew died in 2011, rendering the centuries-old Jewish community in Penang effectively extinct.

Economy 

In spite of its tiny size, Penang, regarded as the Silicon Valley of the East, has one of the largest economies in Malaysia, contributing as much as RM7 billion of the country's tax income in 2015. Penang has the highest Gross Domestic Product (GDP) per capita among Malaysian states. With a GDP per capita of RM49,873 , Penang has also surpassed the World Bank's threshold to be considered a high-income economy, which was set at US$12,056 within the same year.

Furthermore, Penang consistently records one of the lowest unemployment rates within the nation - 2.1% . The state has experienced one of the largest reductions in Gini coefficient within Malaysia as well, at 0.356 in 2016.

In addition, George Town was ranked Malaysia's most attractive destination for commercial property investment by Knight Frank in 2016, surpassing even Kuala Lumpur. The bulk of Penang's FDI  originated from Switzerland, Germany, Hong Kong, the Netherlands, Ireland and Singapore. It is an attractive destination for FDI as it continued to receive investment during the Coronavirus disease 2019, when it received the second highest level of investment in Q1 2020.

Penang's economic growth, particularly since 2008, was described by Bloomberg as Malaysia's "biggest economic success", despite the federal government's focus on other states such as Johor and Sarawak. Penang's economic performance also allowed the Penang state government to completely eradicate the state's public debt by 2016.

Manufacturing 

Since the 1970s, manufacturing has formed the backbone of Penang's economy, contributing 44.8% of the state's GDP  and attracting as many as 3,000 firms to set up operations within the state. Machinery and transport equipment accounted for 71% of Penang's total exports during the first nine months of 2014.

The Bayan Lepas Free Industrial Zone, now regarded as the Silicon Valley of the East, is the main electronics manufacturing hub within Malaysia. Located at the southeastern corner of Penang Island, the zone is home to several high-tech multinational firms, including Dell, Intel, AMD, Motorola, Agilent, Renesas, Osram, Bosch, Sony and Seagate and others

Seberang Perai has witnessed massive industrialisation as well, with industrial estates and oil refineries being established in the late 20th century in areas like Mak Mandin and Perai. The major local firms currently operating in Perai, including Malayan Sugar, Malayawata Steel, Southern Steel, Harvik Rubber and Soon Soon Oilmills, have been joined by multinational companies, such as Mattel, Pensonic, Hitachi, Mitsuoka, Chevron and Honeywell Aerospace. In recent years, Batu Kawan has also been rapidly industrialised, with a number of international firms, such as Boston Scientific and Bose Corporation, setting up manufacturing plants in the town.

Aside from electronics and engineering manufacturing, Penang is Malaysia's main jewellery finishing hub, contributing 85% of the nation's gold and jewellery exports . Penang's gold and jewellery industry is relatively well-established, dating back to the founding of the Penang Goldsmith Association in 1832. Jewellery from Penang is exported to over 20 foreign markets, including Singapore, Hong Kong, Japan, Canada and the United States.

Services 
The services sector has overtaken the manufacturing sector as the largest economic sector in Penang, with the former accounting for 49.3% of Penang's GDP . In addition, almost  of Penang's workforce are employed in services-related industries, which include retail, accommodation, medical tourism, and food and beverages (F&B) sub-sectors.

Medical tourism has emerged as an integral component of Penang's services sector. George Town, in particular, has become the centre of medical tourism within Malaysia, attracting approximately half of the nation's medical tourist arrivals in 2013 and generating about 70% of the country's medical tourism revenue.Penang also has a vibrant retail sub-sector, which employs as many as 24% of Penang's workforce. As the main shopping destination in northern Malaysia, Penang is home to several shopping malls, such as Gurney Plaza, Gurney Paragon, 1st Avenue Mall, Straits Quay, Queensbay Mall and Design Village and other shopping centre in Mainland and Island (Penang). While shopping malls now dominate the retail scene, centuries-old shophouses are still operating alongside George Town's flea markets and wet markets, all of which cater more to local products, including spices, nutmegs and tau sar pneah, a famous Penang delicacy.

Due to the efforts of the Penang state government to promote the state as a shared services and outsourcing (SSO) hub, Penang has attracted the second largest share of investments for Global Business Services (GBS) within Malaysia, after Kuala Lumpur. Penang's SSO industry, which includes international corporations such as AirAsia, Citigroup, Jabil and Dell, has provided more than 8,000 high-income jobs and contributed RM12.79 billion of revenue in 2013.

In addition to these, a startup community has been growing within Penang, including the likes of Piktochart and DeliverEat. Attracted by the cheaper living costs and the presence of several multinational technology firms, Penang's startups are also being actively encouraged by the public and private sectors, with initiatives to encourage entrepreneurship and promote the Internet of Things (IoT).

Furthermore, George Town is Malaysia's second most popular centre for meetings, incentives, conferences and exhibitions (MICE), after Kuala Lumpur. In 2017, Penang hosted 2,511 business events with an estimated economic impact of RM1.002 billion. Among the major MICE venues within Penang are the SPICE Arena, Straits Quay and Prangin Mall.

Commerce

George Town was formerly the financial centre of British Malaya. The first international bank to open a branch in George Town (and by extension, Malaysia) was Standard Chartered in 1875. This was followed by HSBC and the Royal Bank of Scotland in 1885 and 1888 respectively.

To this day, George Town still serves as the financial centre of northern Malaysia. The city contains various Malaysian and international banks, including Standard Chartered, HSBC, Citibank, UOB, OCBC, Bank of China and Bank Negara Malaysia. Most of the international banks still retain their offices at Beach Street, which also serves as the city's main Central Business District.

Since the 1990s, Northam Road, along with Gurney Drive, has also emerged as the George Town's second Central Business District. Northam Road, in particular, hosts an array of financial services, including the Malaysian Employees Provident Fund, as well as accounting, auditing and insurance offices.

Finance and its related activities, such as insurance, auditing and real estate transactions, accounted for more than 8% of Penang's Gross Domestic Product (GDP) .

Tourism 

Penang has always been one of the most popular tourist destinations in Malaysia. Throughout history, the state welcomed some of the most influential personalities, including W. Somerset Maugham, Rudyard Kipling, Lee Kuan Yew, Queen Elizabeth II and King Charles III. Penang is known for its rich heritage and architecture, its vibrant multicultural society, a wide range of modern entertainment and retail choices, natural features such as beaches and hills, and the world-famous Penang cuisine.

Unlike other Malaysian states, Penang does not rely only on air transportation for tourist arrivals. Aside from the Penang International Airport, Swettenham Pier, conveniently located within the heart of George Town, has emerged as one of the major tourist entry points into the state. , Penang attracted nearly 8.6 million tourists, with the airport posting a record 7.2 million passenger arrivals and the pier registering another 1.35 million tourist arrivals. Within the same year, Penang, which contributed close to RM3.9 million of tourism tax revenue, was Malaysia's third largest tourism tax contributor after Kuala Lumpur and Sabah.

In recent years, George Town has received numerous international accolades. The city has been listed by several publications, including the Lonely Planet, CNN, Forbes and Time, as one of Asia's top travel destinations. These are in addition to George Town's reputation as a gastronomic haven, with the CNN placing George Town as one of Asia's best street food cities.

Entrepôt trade and shipping 
Formerly a vital British entrepôt, Penang's maritime trade has greatly declined, due to the loss of George Town's free-port status in 1969 and the concurrent development of Port Klang near the federal capital Kuala Lumpur.

In spite of this, the Port of Penang remains the main harbour within northern Malaysia. The Port of Penang handled more than 1.52 million TEUs of cargo in 2017, making it the third busiest seaport by volume in the country. The Port's strategic location enabled it to service not just northern Malaysia, but also southern Thailand.

Culture

Festivals 
Penang's diverse, cosmopolitan society means that there are a great many celebrations and festivities in any given year. The major cultural and religious festivities in the state include, but not limited to, the Chinese New Year, Eid ul-Fitri, Deepavali, Thaipusam, Vaisakhi, Christmas, Vesak Day and Songkran.

Expatriates residing in Penang have also introduced a host of other celebrations. Bon Odori is celebrated yearly by the Japanese in George Town, while St. Patrick's Day and Oktoberfest, traditionally celebrated by the Irish and the Germans respectively, have also been gaining popularity amongst the locals.

Moreover, Penang hosts several major festivals in any given year. The George Town Festival, first held in 2010, has evolved into one of the largest arts events in Southeast Asia, while the Penang Hot Air Balloon Fiesta attracts close to 200,000 visitors from all over the world.

Performance arts

George Town is the birthplace of a unique form of the Chingay procession. Introduced in 1919, Penang's variant of Chingay includes the act of balancing gigantic flags on one's forehead or hands. A yearly Chingay parade is held in the city every December, though Chingay performances are also a common feature of Chinese festivities and major state celebrations in Penang.

Bangsawan, which was also developed in Penang, is a type of Malay theatre that incorporates Indian, Western, Islamic, Chinese and Indonesian influences. Boria is also indigenous to Penang, featuring singing accompanied by violin, maracas and tabla.

Aside from these, the state has orchestras based in George Town, the Penang Philharmonic Orchestra, Penang Symphony Orchestra, as well as several chamber and musical organisations, including the award-winning social enterprise, The Rondo Production . Dewan Sri Pinang and Penangpac within Straits Quay are two of the major performing venues in the city.

Street art 

In 2012, as part of the George Town Festival, Lithuanian artist Ernest Zacharevic created a series of 6 wall paintings depicting local culture, inhabitants and lifestyles. In addition, several wrought iron caricatures have been installed within George Town, with each caricature detailing the city's history and the daily lives of its inhabitants. In recent years, the street art scene has also begun to grow out of the city, in areas such as Balik Pulau and Butterworth.

In addition, art exhibitions are frequently held at cultural centres within George Town, such as the Hin Bus Depot.

Museums
The Penang State Museum and Art Gallery in George Town is the state's primary public museum; it houses relics, photographs, maps, and other artefacts that document the history and culture of Penang.

Other museums in the city focus on religious and cultural aspects, as well as famous personalities, including the Penang Islamic Museum, Sun Yat-sen Museum, Batik Painting Museum, and Universiti Sains Malaysia Museum and Gallery. Besides that, the birthplace of Malaysia's legendary singer-actor, P. Ramlee, has been restored and turned into a museum

In recent years, private-run museums have sprung up throughout the city, such as the Camera Museum and the Penang Toy Museum. A handful of newer 3D visual and interactive museums have also been established, such as the Made-in-Penang Interactive Museum and the Penang Time Tunnel.

Architecture
Penang is home to a relatively wide variety of architectures, both historical and modern. The historical core of George Town has been inscribed as a UNESCO World Heritage Site due to its unique architectural and cultural townscape without parallel anywhere in East and Southeast Asia.

Fort Cornwallis, in George Town, was the first structure built by the British in Penang. The city's UNESCO World Heritage Site also covers several important landmarks, including the City Hall, the Penang High Court, St. George's Church, the Eastern & Oriental Hotel and the Central Business District at Beach Street. Aside from European architecture, a huge assortment of Asian architectural styles also exists throughout George Town, exemplified by buildings like the Kong Hock Keong Temple, Cheong Fatt Tze Mansion, the Pinang Peranakan Mansion, Khoo Kongsi, Snake Temple, Kapitan Keling Mosque and Sri Mahamariamman Temple. Meanwhile, the Siamese and the Burmese have also left a visible impact on certain landmarks within the city, such as Wat Chaiyamangkalaram, Dhammikarama Burmese Temple and Kek Lok Si.

Aside from the colonial era architecture, Penang Island contains most of the skyscrapers within Penang, with the state's tallest buildings all located within the island. The tallest skyscrapers in George Town, and by extension, Penang, include the Komtar Tower, Setia V, Gurney Paragon and Arte S.

Cuisine

George Town, popularly regarded as the food capital of Malaysia, is renowned for its good and varied cuisine which incorporates Malay, Chinese, Indian, Peranakan, Thai and European influences. The city has been recognised by various publications, such as Time Magazine, CNN and Lonely Planet, as one of the Asian cities with the best street cuisine. According to Time Magazine in 2004, "nowhere else can such great tasting food be so cheap," whilst Robin Barton of the Lonely Planet described George Town as the culinary epicentre of the many cultures that arrived after it was set up as a trading port in 1786, from Malays to Indians, Acehenese to Chinese, Burmese to Thais.

The various street dishes and delicacies of Penang include (but not limited to) asam laksa, Nasi Lemuni, char kway teow, curry mee, Hokkien mee, nasi kandar, oh chien (fried oyster omelette), lor bak, rojak, pasembur, chendol, ais kacang, and tau sar pneah (bean paste biscuit).

In art and literature
In her poetical illustration , to a drawing by Samuel Austin, Letitia Elizabeth Landon compares the beauties of the island with those of the speaker's beloved.

Education 
Penang's literacy rate stood at 98.2% , whilst specifically, the literacy rate of Penang's youth between 15 and 24 years of age rose to 99.5% in 2014, after Selangor and Kuala Lumpur. Correspondingly, Penang has the third highest Human Development Index within Malaysia.

, Penang, including both the mainland and the island contains a total of 48 tertiary institutions (including universities, colleges, medical colleges, industrial training institutes and teaching schools), 12 international schools, 110 secondary schools, 271 primary schools and 602 kindergartens.

In particular, George Town is home to some of Malaysia's oldest schools. Established in 1816, Penang Free School is the oldest English school in Southeast Asia, while numerous public schools originally founded during the colonial era in Penang include St. Xavier's Institution, St. George's Girls' School and Methodist Boys' School. In addition, the city is a pioneer in Chinese education within the region; following the establishment of Chung Hwa Confucian High School in 1904, several prominent Chinese schools were built, such as Chung Ling High School, Penang Chinese Girls' High School, Heng Ee High School, Jit Sin High School and Phor Tay High School.

As a popular destination for expatriates, George Town contains a number of international schools as well, such as Uplands International School, Dalat International School, Tenby International School and Hua Xia International School. These schools offer primary and secondary education up to A Levels and International Baccalaureate. A few of these schools, such as Penang Japanese School and Chinese Taipei School, cater to expatriates of specific nationalities.

Universiti Sains Malaysia (USM) is the premier public university within Penang. Established in 1969 as Malaysia's second university, it was originally named Universiti Pulau Pinang (University of Penang). The main campus is situated at Gelugor, while an engineering campus has been built in Nibong Tebal. , it was ranked 207th in the QS World University Rankings, the fourth highest within the country.

RCSI & UCD Malaysia Campus is a medical university in George Town, with teaching hospitals in Penang and Perak. Founded as a private medical school in 1996, RUMC gained university status in 2018 and is the only Irish university branch campus in Malaysia. Graduates of RUMC are conferred degrees awarded and recognised by the National University of Ireland.

Other tertiary institutions within Penang include Wawasan Open University, Han Chiang University College of Communication, DISTED College, Sentral College, SEGi College, KDU College, INTI International College, Equator Academy of Arts, Penang Skills and Development Centre and Lam Wah Ee Nursing College. Aside from these institutions, RECSAM, a research and training facility aimed at the enhancement of the science and mathematics education in Southeast Asia, is sited within Penang as well.

The state also contains 107 libraries, including the Penang State Library and the Penang Digital Library. The latter, launched by the Penang state government in 2016, is the first digital library in Malaysia.

Health care

Health care in Penang is adequately provided by the numerous public and private hospitals throughout the state. These hospitals have also helped Penang to emerge as the centre of Medical tourism in Malaysia. The Penang General Hospital, administered and funded by the Malaysian Ministry of Health, is the main tertiary referral hospital within northern Malaysia. It is supported by five other public hospitals within Penang, all of which also come under the administration of the country's Ministry of Health.

Aside from public hospitals, Penang is home to 15 private hospitals, including Penang Adventist Hospital, Lam Wah Ee Hospital, Mount Miriam Cancer Hospital, Gleneagles Medical Centre, Island Hospital, Loh Guan Lye Specialists Centre and Pantai Hospital. These hospitals cater not only to the local population, but also to patients from other states and foreign health tourists.

Infant mortality rate within Penang dropped by 85% between 1970 and 2000 to 5.7 per 1,000 live births, while neonatal mortality rate also decreased by 84.7% within this corresponding period to 4.1 per 1,000 live births. , Penang's life expectancy at birth stood at 72.5 years for men and 77.7 years for women.

Media

Print 
George Town was once the nucleus of Malaysia's print press. The nation's first newspaper was founded in the city – the Prince of Wales Island Gazette in 1806. The Star, currently one of Malaysia's top dailies, has its origins as a regional newspaper founded in George Town in the 1970s, while the country's oldest Chinese newspaper, Kwong Wah Yit Poh, was also established in the city in 1910.

In 2011, the then Chief Minister of Penang, Lim Guan Eng, launched the Penang edition of Time Out. This version of the international listings magazine is published in three versions - a yearly guide, a website and a mobile app.

The Penang state government also publishes its own multi-lingual newspaper, Buletin Mutiara, which is distributed for free every fortnight. The Penang-centric newspaper focuses on the current issues within Penang.

Film and television 
Due to its well-preserved colonial-era cityscape, a number of movies have been filmed within George Town, such as Crazy Rich Asians, Anna and the King, Lust, Caution and You Mean the World to Me, the latter of which is the first movie to be filmed entirely in Penang Hokkien. Singaporean drama series, The Little Nyonya and The Journey: Tumultuous Times, were also filmed within the city's UNESCO World Heritage Site. In addition, the city became one of the pit-stops of The Amazing Race 16, The Amazing Race Asia 4 and The Amazing Race Asia 5.

Radio broadcasting 
The history of Penang radio broadcasting began in 1925 when the Penang Wireless Association was established. With the issuance of the first shortwave radio broadcast licence on 24 August 1934, Station ZHJ – Malaya's first radio station was launched and went on the air from Khoo Sian Ewe's house at Perak Road. It was transmitted via 493 meter waves from 7 p.m. to 10 p.m. everyday in Malay, English, Chinese, Hokkien and Tamil. During the Japanese occupation period from 19 December 1941 until 2 September 1945, the Imperial Army used Penang Chinese Recreation Club at Burmah Road in George Town as radio station to transmit propaganda and renamed the station as Penang Hoso Kyoku (Penang Broadcasting Corporation). Following the surrender of the Japanese Army, the British came back into power and reclaimed the station and the building, which later became the state branch of Radio Malaya on 1 April 1946. While news programmes were produced in Singapore, the state branch in Penang produces regional programmings for the radio station.

Radio Malaya Penang moved its headquarters from Chinese Recreational Club to United Engineers Building at Bishop Street in 1948 and established its temporary studio in a temporary office building in Gelugor, which moved to Sepoy Lines Road in 1955. In 1961, it moved into its present building at Burmah Road, which was officially opened by Governor Raja Uda on 30 October 1965. Penang state radio station became part of the Radio Malaysia network on 16 September 1963, when Malaysia was established and the larger Radio Televisyen Malaysia (RTM) on 11 October 1969, following the merger of the nation's Radio and Television operations. Today, RTM Penang state branch operates one radio channel - Mutiara FM.

Transportation

Land 

Penang Island is connected to the mainland by two bridges. The  Penang Bridge, completed in 1985, spans the Penang Strait between Gelugor on the island and Perai on the mainland. Spanning , the Second Penang Bridge is located further south, linking Batu Maung on the island to Batu Kawan on the mainland. The latter was opened to the public in 2014 and is currently the second longest bridge in Southeast Asia.

The North–South Expressway, a  expressway along the western part of Peninsular Malaysia, passes through Seberang Perai. Aside from the regular Malayan Railway services, the Butterworth railway station is the southernmost terminus of the State Railway of Thailand's Southern Line and the International Express from Bangkok. Notably, the train station is also one of the main stops of the Eastern and Oriental Express service between Bangkok and Singapore.

On Penang Island, the Tun Dr Lim Chong Eu Expressway is a vital coastal highway that runs along the island's eastern seaboard, connecting George Town with the Penang Bridge, the Bayan Lepas Free Industrial Zone, the Penang International Airport and the Second Penang Bridge. The Federal Route 6 is a pan-island trunk road, while the two major ring roads within George Town are the George Town Inner Ring Road and the Penang Middle Ring Road.

In Seberang Perai, the major ring roads and expressways include the Butterworth Outer Ring Road (BORR) and the Butterworth–Kulim Expressway.

Public transportation
Under British rule, George Town served as a pioneer in public transportation within British Malaya. The city's first tram system, originally powered by steam, began operations in the 1880s. Although the tram lines have since been disused, another colonial legacy, the trishaw, still plies the city's streets, albeit catering primarily for tourists.Buses now form the backbone of public transportation within Penang. Public bus services are mainly provided by Rapid Penang, which operates 56 routes within Greater Penang, including interstate routes into Kedah and Perak. Among the routes are free-of-charge transit services such as the Central Area Transit, the Congestion Alleviation Transport and the Pulau Tikus Loop. In addition, the Hop-On Hop-Off bus service, which utilises open-topped double decker buses, has been introduced for tourists within George Town.

Meanwhile, the only rail-based transportation system within Penang is the Penang Hill Railway, a funicular railway to the peak of Penang Hill. Opened in 1923, it is also the sole funicular railway system in Malaysia. The Penang state government has recently drawn up plans to bring in more rail-based transport systems throughout Penang, as part of the Penang Transport Master Plan. What are purposed are a Light Rail Transit line between George Town and Bayan Lepas, two monorail lines that connect George Town with Air Itam, Paya Terubong and Tanjung Tokong, a tram line limited to within George Town's UNESCO World Heritage Site and a cross-strait cable car line linking Komtar in George Town and Penang Sentral in Butterworth Currently, the Light Rapid Transit line between George Town and the Penang International Airport, also known as the Bayan Lepas LRT line, is being allocated the top priority by the Penang state government. In April 2019, the LRT project was received conditional approval from the federal government. Construction was expected to commence in June 2020.

Efforts are also being undertaken to promote pedestrianisation and the use of bicycles as an environmentally friendly mode of transportation. Dedicated cycling lanes have been paved throughout the city and in 2016, George Town became the first Malaysian city to operate a public bicycle-sharing service, with the inauguration of LinkBike.

The Penang Sentral in Butterworth is the main rapid transit hub within Penang. Penang Sentral's location, adjacent to the Sultan Abdul Halim Ferry Terminal and the Butterworth railway station, allows it to function as a termini for public and interstate buses, ferry and train services.

Air

It serves as the main airport for northern Malaysia, with frequent links to major regional cities such as Kuala Lumpur, Singapore, Bangkok, Jakarta, Ho Chi Minh City, Taipei, Hong Kong, Guangzhou and Doha. Penang International Airport is Malaysia's second busiest in terms of cargo traffic and recorded the third highest passenger traffic of all Malaysian airports .

The airport is also a hub for two Malaysian low-cost carriers - AirAsia and Firefly. Among the international carriers that operate out of the airport are Scoot, Jetstar Asia Airways, China Airlines, China Southern Airlines, Thai Smile and Qatar Airways.

Sea

The Port of Penang, the main harbour in northern Malaysia, is operated by the Penang Port Commission. The Port consists of seven facilities, with six of them in Butterworth and Perai on the mainland, including the North Butterworth Container Terminal, Butterworth Deep Water Wharves and the Prai Bulk Cargo Terminal. The Port of Penang, the third busiest seaport in Malaysia, handled more than 1.52 million TEUs of cargo in 2017.

Meanwhile, Swettenham Pier, situated in the heart of George Town, is the sole Port facility on Penang Island. The pier now accommodates cruise ships, making it one of the major entry points into Penang. , Swettenham Pier recorded 1.35 million tourist arrivals, thereby surpassing Port Klang as the busiest cruise shipping terminal in Malaysia; the pier has also attracted some of the world's largest cruise liners, such as the RMS Queen Mary 2. The pier also serves as a homeport for regional-based cruise ships.

Occasionally, the Port of Penang hosts warships as well, including those from Singapore, the United States and most recently, China.

The cross-strait Rapid Ferry service connects George Town and Butterworth, and was formerly the only transportation link between Penang Island and the mainland until the completion of the Penang Bridge in 1985. At the time of writing, six ferries ply the Penang Strait between George Town and Butterworth daily.

Sports

Penang has a relatively well-developed sporting infrastructure. The Penang State Stadium in Batu Kawan is the main stadium within the state, whereas the City Stadium in George Town is the sole stadium within the city. Both stadia function as the home ground of the Penang FA.

The SPICE Arena in Bayan Baru is another major sporting venue within Penang, consisting of an indoor arena and an aquatics centre.The Nicol David International Squash Centre at Gelugor is one of the major squash training facilities in Malaysia and was reportedly where squash legend Nicol David first trained during her childhood years. George Town is also home to Malaysia's oldest equestrian centre, the Penang Turf Club, which was established in 1864. In addition, Penang contains a total of three golf courses, one of which is on Penang Island.

The major annual sporting events within Penang include the Penang International Dragon Boat Festival and the Penang Bridge International Marathon. The former, held every December in Teluk Bahang, is a dragon boat race that has attracted several international teams, including those from Singapore, Thailand, Brunei, China, South Korea and Australia. The latter is a marathon which includes the Penang Bridge as its route. Held every November, it attracted a record 35,000 participants from 85 countries in 2017.

Among the national and international sporting events that were hosted within Penang include the 2000 Sukma Games, the 2001 Southeast Asian Games and the 2013 Women's World Open Squash Championship. Penang has also hosted the 2018 Asia Pacific Masters Games, the first edition of a Masters Games within Asia.

Utilities
Water supply, which comes under the jurisdiction of the Penang state government, is wholly managed by the Penang Water Supply Corporation (PBAPP). The state enjoys the lowest domestic water tariff in Malaysia, at RM0.32 per 1,000 litres. Penang's water supply is obtained from several sources, namely the Air Itam Dam, Teluk Bahang Dam, Mengkuang Dam, Bukit Panchor Dam, Berapit Dam, Cherok Tok Kun Dam, the Guillemard Reservoir, the Penang Botanic Gardens and the Muda River. The latter, which forms Penang's northern border with Kedah, provides up to 80% of Penang's water supply.

In 1904, George Town became the first city within British Malaya to be supplied with electricity, upon the completion of a hydroelectric scheme. Currently, electricity for industrial and domestic consumption is provided by Tenaga Nasional Berhad (TNB), which operates a 398MW oil-powered power plant at Gelugor.

, Penang had a recorded broadband penetration rate of 80.3%, the highest among all Malaysian states. Penang is also the first Malaysian state to provide its citizens with free internet connection. Penang Free Wi-Fi, launched by the Penang state government in 2008, aims to boost internet penetration throughout Penang and is provided free-of-charge. Its bandwidth speeds within the George Town city centre were increased to 3 Mbit/s, while 1,560 hotspots have been installed throughout the state.

See also

 International rankings of Penang

References

Further reading

External links
 
 
 Penang State Government 
 Penang Island City Council
 Seberang Perai City Council
 Trading Council

 
1786 establishments in Asia
Peninsular Malaysia
Populated places established in 1786
States of Malaysia
Strait of Malacca